The Pool of the 2005 Fed Cup Asia/Oceania Zone Group II composed of four teams competing in a round robin competition. The top two teams qualifying for Group I next year.

Uzbekistan vs. Philippines

Syria vs. Turkmenistan

Uzbekistan vs. Syria

Philippines vs. Turkmenistan

Uzbekistan vs. Turkmenistan

Philippines vs. Syria

  and  advanced to Group I for next year. Uzbekistan placed fourth, whereas Philippines placed sixth, and was thus relegated back down to Group II for 2007.

See also
Fed Cup structure

References

External links
 Fed Cup website

2005 Fed Cup Asia/Oceania Zone